Trichoglottis atropurpurea, the dark purple trichoglottis, is a species of orchid endemic to the Philippines. This hot to warm growing epiphyte was first found growing in mangrove swamps in the islands of Biliran, Catanduanes, Mindanao (Agusan del Sur and Davao) and Polillo. The plant shares the same appearance with T. philippinensis except for the rich dark color of the blooms and slight variation of the perianth. This species was first described in 1877 by the German botanist Heinrich Gustav Reichenbach, an expert on the orchid family. At that time, thousands of newly discovered orchids were being sent back to Europe, and he was responsible for identifying, describing and classifying many of these new discoveries.

Description
Fleshy white roots grow out of the stems which are leafy towards the tip. The leaves, which overlap and semi-clasp the stem are oblong or oblong-ovate and slightly keeled. The five tepals are some shade of dark reddish-purple, and the hairy, lobed, lip is white with purple streaks and a splash of yellow near the base.

Gallery

References

External links

Endemic orchids of the Philippines
Orchids of the Philippines
Plants described in 1877
atropurpurea